Jack Eduardo Jean-Baptiste Cruz (born 20 December 1999) is a Honduran professional footballer who plays as a midfielder for C.D. Olimpia.

Career
The midfielder was promoted to the first team after playing on the Motague U-19 team in January 2018. Baptiste joined Loudoun United on loan for the rest of 2019.

References

External links
 
USL profile

1999 births
Living people
Honduran footballers
Honduran expatriate footballers
Association football midfielders
F.C. Motagua players
Loudoun United FC players
C.D. Real de Minas players
Liga Nacional de Fútbol Profesional de Honduras players
USL Championship players
People from San Pedro Sula
Expatriate soccer players in the United States
Honduran expatriate sportspeople in the United States
Honduran people of Haitian descent
Sportspeople of Haitian descent